Hayrünnisa is a Turkish given name for females. It is the Turkish form of the Arabic name Khairunnisa, which means "goodness of women". People named Hayrünnisa include:

 Hayrünnisa Gül (born 1965), wife of Abdullah Gül
 Hayrünnisa Rustem, mother of Ahmet Ertegun

See also
 Khairunnisa

Turkish feminine given names